FC Mtskheta is a Georgian association football club at Meore Liga.

References

Football clubs in Georgia (country)